The Wadesboro Downtown Historic District is a  national historic district located at Wadesboro, Anson County, North Carolina.  It included 81 contributing buildings, one contributing structure and one contributing object (Confederate Memorial Monument) in the governmental and commercial core of the City of Wadesboro.  It includes work by architects Wheeler & Stern.  Notable buildings include the Anson County Courthouse (1914), U.S. Post Office, the Boggan-Hammond House and Alexander Little Wing, the Burns Inn (now the Leavitt Funeral Home), Parsons Pharmacy, Leak's Hardware Company Building, and the Ansonia Theater.

It was listed on the National Register of Historic Places in 1999.

References

Historic districts on the National Register of Historic Places in North Carolina
Gothic Revival architecture in North Carolina
Colonial Revival architecture in North Carolina
Geography of Anson County, North Carolina
Buildings and structures in Anson County, North Carolina
National Register of Historic Places in Anson County, North Carolina